Arthur Rankin may refer to:

Arthur Rankin (surveyor) (1816–1893), Canadian surveyor, entrepreneur, and politician
Arthur Rankin Jr. (1924–2014), American producer, director, and writer
Arthur E. Rankin (1888–1962), American teacher and politician
Arthur Rankin (actor) (1895–1947), American actor
Arthur Rankin (footballer) (1904–1962), Scottish footballer

See also
Arthur Ranken (1806–1886), Dean of Aberdeen and Orkney